Newcastle High School is a government-funded co-educational comprehensive secondary day school, located in Newcastle West, a suburb of Newcastle, in the Hunter region of New South Wales, Australia.

Established in 1929, the school enrolled approximately 1,080 students in 2018, from Year 7 to Year 12, of whom nine percent identified as Indigenous Australians and nine percent were from a language background other than English. The school is operated by the NSW Department of Education in accordance with the education curriculum, as determined by the New South Wales Education Standards Authority. Newcastle High School has one of the largest Special Education Unit in the Entire Hunter Region. As of October 2020 the principal is Janene Rosser.

History
Newcastle High School, which began in 1976, is the last of three schools that shared a similar and sometimes common history: 
 The School on The Hillestablished in 1906
 Newcastle Girls' High Schoolan academically selective girls' only high school which began its separate existence (from "The Hill") in 1929 at Hamilton
 Newcastle Boys' High Schoolan academically selective boys' only high school which moved to Waratah in 1934

The school occupies the campuses previously occupied by two girls' high schools: Hunter Girls' High School and Newcastle Girls' High School. The campus of Newcastle Boys' High School became non-selective and co-educational in 1977 and changed its name to Waratah High School that same year. Later it became Waratah Technology High School, then Callaghan College Waratah Technology Campus.

Ravens
Newcastle High has a large population of ravens and the students hold the birds in high regard. Students, both past and present, see ravens as a symbol of their teen years and view them as a mascot for the school.

Controversies
In January 2021, recently appointed Principal Dr Janene Rosser brought in new rules involving bell times and uniform restrictions. Some students and parents have expressed their dislike of the new rules, which they consider give students too little time to get to class. They also believe the stricter new uniform rules are “over the top”. Some staff, students and guardians have reportedly expressed the view that Rosser's excessive implementation of these rules is a PR stunt aimed at making the school look good while reportedly ignoring requests for repairs by her fellow staff members and certain alumni. It has also been said that some students falling behind have found it hard coping with the new systems, and are reportedly being ignored by Rosser when they ask for a return to the status quo ante (i.e. the previous rules).

Notable alumni

Newcastle Girls' High School 
 Virginia Chadwick - former NSW Cabinet Minister and politician
 Julie Sutton - former Mayor of Warringah Council

Newcastle High School (1976–present)
 Jamie Brazier - Papua New Guinea cricketer
 Belinda Clark - Australian women's cricket captain
 Ben Gillies - drummer in Australian rock band Silverchair
 Chris Joannou - bass guitarist in Australian rock band Silverchair
 Daniel Johns - vocalist and guitarist in Australian rock band Silverchair
 Miranda Otto - actress

See also

 List of government schools in New South Wales
 Education in Australia

References

 Educational institutions established in 1929
 Public high schools in New South Wales
 Education in Newcastle, New South Wales
1929 establishments in Australia